Barbarossa, a name meaning "red beard" in Italian, primarily refers to:

 Frederick Barbarossa (1122–1190), Holy Roman Emperor
 Hayreddin Barbarossa (c. 1478–1546), Ottoman admiral
 Operation Barbarossa, the Axis invasion of the Soviet Union in World War II, commencing 22 June 1941

It may also refer to:

Arts and entertainment

Fictional characters
 Barbarossa Rugner, a character in the 1995 Suikoden PlayStation role-playing game
 Barbarossa, pirate and protagonist in the 1953 film Raiders of the Seven Seas
  Barbarossa, a character in the Legends of Dune trilogy
 Barbarossa, a character in the book Thief Lord
 Barbarossa, a commander in the 2014 anime Lord Marksman and Vanadis

Music
 Barbarossa (album), a 1996 album by Cubanate
 Barbarossa, a 2001 album by Orplid
 "Barbarossa", a 1994 song by Sordid Humor
 "Barbarossa", a 1993 song by Sex Gang Children
 "Barbarossa", a 2012 song by Lamb of God

Games
 Barbarossa (board game), a board game by Klaus Teuber
 Barbarossa: The Russo-German War 1941-45, a 1969 board wargame published by Simulations Publications Inc. 
 Barbarossa (video game), a 1992 war simulation game released for the Super Famicom in Japan
 Operation Barbarossa - The Struggle for Russia (PC game), a PC game

Other arts and entertainment
 Barbarossa (film), an Italian film starring Rutger Hauer
 The Barbaroosa, a fictional pirate ship in the Miniskirt Pirates light novel series by Yūichi Sasamoto and corresponding anime Bodacious Space Pirates
 Barbaroslar, a Turkish TV series also known as Barbarossa

People
 Oruç Reis (c. 1474–1518), called Barbarossa or Aruj, Ottoman Turkish captain and Bey of Algiers
 Theodore Cotillo Barbarossa (1906–1992), American sculptor
 Luca Barbarossa (born 1961), Italian singer-songwriter
 David Barbarossa (born 1961), British drummer
 Sergio Barbarossa, Italian engineer
 Barbarossa (musician) or James Mathé, a British musician who performs under the alias Barbarossa

Ships
 Barbarossa class ocean liner, a class of ten German ocean liners built between 1896 and 1902
 SS Barbarossa, seized by the US during World War I and renamed 
 SMS Kaiser Barbarossa, a German pre-dreadnought battleship launched in 1900
 Barbaros Hayreddin, an Ottoman battleship of World War I
 RV Barbaros Hayreddin Paşa, a Turkish seismographic research/survey vessel owned and operated by the Turkish Petroleum Corporation

Other uses
 Barbarossa (grape), name of several Italian wine grapes
 Barbaroux, a French wine grape that is sometimes known as Barbarossa
 1860 Barbarossa (1973 SK), a main-belt asteroid

See also
 Barbarossa city, a nickname for five German cities that Emperor Barbarossa stayed in or near for some time
Barbarosa, a 1982 American film starring Willie Nelson and Gary Busey
Barbarosa, Texas, a community in the United States
Barbossa (disambiguation)